The  was a fleet of the Imperial Japanese Navy, their roles were invasion and maintenance of the public order in southwestern area the French Indochina, Philippines, British Malaya and Dutch East Indies.

Organization

Southern Expeditionary Fleet/1st Southern Expeditionary Fleet
The Southern Expeditionary Fleet was organized for Invasion of French Indochina on 31 July 1941. Describe the  also. Their jurisdiction area was French Indochina, Singapore and westward.
Structure (extract)

Commander in chief

Chief of staff

2nd Southern Expeditionary Fleet
The  was reorganized from 3rd Fleet on 10 March 1942. Describe 3rd Fleet about predecessor of the 2nd Southern Expeditionary Fleet. Their jurisdiction area was Dutch East Indies.
Structure (extract)

Commander in chief

Chief of staff

3rd Southern Expeditionary Fleet
The  was organized on 3 January 1942 for invasion of the Philippines.
Structure (extract)

Commander in chief

Chief of staff

4th Southern Expeditionary Fleet
The  was independent from 2nd Southern Expeditionary Fleet for maintenance of the public order in western New Guinea on 30 November 1943. Dissolved on 10 March 1945, their remaining units were unified to 10th Area Fleet.
Structure (extract)

Commander in chief

Chief of staff

Bibliography
 Senshi Sōsho, Asagumo Simbun (Japan)
 Vol. 91, Combined Fleet #1, "Until outbreak of war", 1975
 Vol. 80, Combined Fleet #2, "Until June 1942", 1975
 Vol. 77, Combined Fleet #3, "Until February 1943", 1974
 Vol. 39, Combined Fleet #4, "First part of the Third step Operations", 1970
 Vol. 71, Combined Fleet #5, "Middle part of the Third step Operations", 1974
 Vol. 45, Combined Fleet #6, "Latter part of the Third step Operations", 1971
 Vol. 93, Combined Fleet #7, "Last part of the War", 1976
Rekishi Dokuhon, Special issue No. 33 Overview of admirals of the Imperial Japanese Navy, Shin-Jinbutsuōraisha, 1999
The Japanese Modern Historical Manuscripts Association, Organizations, structures and personnel affairs of the Imperial Japanese Army & Navy, University of Tokyo Press, 1971 

Fleets of the Imperial Japanese Navy
Military units and formations established in 1941
Military units and formations disestablished in 1945